Tālīsh is a region that stretches north from the Sefīd-Rūd river, which cuts through the Alborz mountains in Iran's Gilan Province, to the Aras river in the south of Azerbaijan. The region is inhabited by the Talish people who speak the Talish language. The territory and the language set apart Talish from its neighbors.

Etymology 

The name is first found in the Armenian translation of the Alexander Romance as "Tʿalis̲h̲". The Persian pronunciation of the name in plural form was "Talishan".

History 
In the Ilkhanate times, the Ispahbads of Gilan have had a principality on the borders of Gilan and Mughan, with a fortress and villages. In later times, a local Khan had his seat at Lankaran and was subject to the Persian monarchs. Peter the Great, Emperor of Russia, first occupied the region during 1722–1732 and then it was returned to Safavid Persia. It was again occupied by Russia in 1796 and during the Russo-Persian War (1804–1813). In 1813 after the Storming of Lankaran most parts of the region were annexed by Russia and a smaller part remained within Persia. The Treaty of Gulistan of 24 October 1813, awarded to Russia the greater part of Talish, the part north of the Astara river.

Geography 
Talish is located in the southwest of the Caspian Sea and stretches to the north for more than 150 kilometers. Talish consisted of the Talish Mountains and supplemented by a narrow coastal strip. High rainfall, dozens of narrow valleys, discharging into the Caspian Sea, or into the Anzali Lagoon, fertile soil and dense vegetation ( home of the extinct Caspian tiger) are some geographical features of this land. In the north, Talish merges into the Mugan plain. This territory shapes the historical habitat of Talishi people who have lived a nomadic life, moving along the mountainous streams. Northern part of the Talish includes the districts of Astara, Lankaran, Lerik, Yardymli, Masally, and Jalilabad, with the exception of the small sub-district of Anbaran located on the western side of the mountain chain in the Ardabil Province.

Demography 
Most of the Talishis are Shiite Muslims.

See also 
 Talish-Mugan culture

Footnotes

Notes

References

Sources

Further reading 

 

Divided regions
Geography of Azerbaijan
Geography of the Caucasus
Iranian Plateau
Regions of Iran
Talysh